Euroea in Phoenicia was a city in the late Roman province of Phoenicia Secunda. today Hawarin, north of al-Qaryatayn and on the road from Damascus to Palmyra. There are ruins of a Roman castellum and of a basilica.

History

The true name of this city seems to have been Hawârin; as such it appears in a Syriac inscription of the fourth to the sixth century. According to Ptolemy it was situated in the Palmyrene province. Georgius Cyprius calls it Euarios or Justinianopolis.

Bishopric 

The Notitiae episcopatuum of the Patriarchate of Antioch (6th century) gives Euroea as a suffragan see of the archdiocese of Damascus. One of its bishops, Thomas, is known in 451; there is some uncertainty about another, John, who lived a little later.

Euroea is included in the Catholic Church's list of titular sees. Until 1935 it was called Evaria (Euaria, Euroea).

Notes

External links
Catholic Encyclopedia, Euaria

Catholic titular sees in Asia
Populated places of the Byzantine Empire